Élisabeth Thérèse Marie Juliette Boselli (11 March 1914 – 25 November 2005), was a French military and civilian pilot. She was the first female fighter pilot to serve in the French Air Force, and held eight world records for distance, altitude and speed.

Biography 
Boselli was born in Paris on 11 March 1914. She studied at École des Sciences Politiques in Paris and graduated in 1935. While a student, she was involved in various humanitarian organizations, including the Red Cross. She became interested in aviation after attending an aviation conference with her brother. Initially she volunteered at air fields, working in hangars and on engines, until in January 1938 she obtained her private pilot's license. She purchased her own aircraft, a Leopoldoff, began training in aerobatics, and decided to earn her public pilot's license. However, World War II broke out and all civilian training was cancelled; Boselli's flight log from that period ends on 4 August 1939.

In 1944, a corps of female military pilots was formed and Boselli joined, with the rank of second lieutenant. She was trained in aerobatics and became a trainer herself. On February 12, 1946 she received her military pilot's license, becoming the first woman in France to do so. As the war had ended, however, female pilots were not needed and she was offered an administrative position instead. Boselli declined, and chose to return to civilian aviation. In May 1947 she began training as a glider pilot under Paul Lepanse at Beynes, obtaining her licence four months later. Boselli immediately began to enter competitions, setting a number of records. In 1951, Boselli visited the United States of America and met a pair of seaplane pilots who offered her the opportunity to fly a seaplane; she completed her training in 10 days and successfully achieved a seaplane pilot licence.

Boselli returned to the military in 1952, joining a presentation squadron of aerobatic pilots based at Étampes called Patrouille de France. Boselli and the squadron performed in Monaco, Algeria and Spain, with Boselli as one of the solo performers. In 1957, she was offered an assignment in Algeria, which she accepted. She was based at Oued Hamimine, and flew military evacuations, transport missions and delivered supplies and mail to troops.

By the age of 45, she had accumulated 900 flight hours and 335 missions, and ceased flying. She spent the remainder of her career as an attaché-editor in the air navigation service until her retirement in 1969.

In her retirement, Boselli was president of the history committee of the Aero Club of France, and wrote her memoirs. Boselli died in Lyon on November 25, 2005 and is buried in Guillotière Cemetery.

Records held 
 World women's altitude records for single glider: reached 5,300 m on December 22, 1947 and 5,600 m on April 6, 1948
 World altitude record for light aircraft: 5,791 m on May 21, 1949
 World women's speed record for closed-circuit jets: 746 km/h on January 26, 1955
 World women's distance record for closed-circuit jets: 1,840 km on February 21, 1955
 World record for distance in a straight line for jet aircraft:  2,331.22 km on March 1, 1955

Recognition 
For her services to her country, she received the Legion of Honor, the Cross for Military Valour and the Aeronautical Medal. There is a street in Lyon named after Boselli. A parc near the Porte de Versailles in Paris is named after her. In 2013, a housing estate was built on a former airfield in Angers, and was named the Boselli neighbourhood.

References 

1914 births
2005 deaths
Military personnel from Paris
Sciences Po alumni
French women aviators
French Air and Space Force personnel
French glider pilots
Aerobatic pilots
French military personnel of the Algerian War
Recipients of the Legion of Honour
Recipients of the Aeronautical Medal
Recipients of the Cross for Military Valour
Flight altitude record holders
Flight distance record holders
Flight speed record holders
Glider flight record holders
French aviation record holders
French women aviation record holders
20th-century French women